Omar Antonio Williams (born 1977) is an American attorney serving as a United States district judge of the United States District Court for the District of Connecticut. He previously served as a judge of the New London District Superior Court from 2016 to 2021.

Early life and education 

Williams was born in Rochester, New York. He earned a Bachelor of Arts degree from the University of Connecticut in 1998 and a Juris Doctor from the University of Connecticut School of Law in 2002.

Career 

Williams began his career as an assistant public defender. In 2014, he was nominated by Governor Dannel Malloy to serve as a judge of the New London District Superior Court.  On January 30, 2015, he was confirmed by a 34–0 vote. Williams was involved with the New England Regional Judicial Opioid Initiative, the Sentence Review Division, and the Wiretap Panel. In 2020, Williams served on a task force that provided recommendations on reforming the way jurors are selected for trial in Connecticut.

Federal judicial service 
On June 15, 2021, President Joe Biden nominated Williams to serve as a United States district judge for the United States District Court for the District of Connecticut to the seat vacated by Judge Alvin W. Thompson, who assumed senior status on August 31, 2018. On July 28, 2021, a hearing on his nomination was held before the Senate Judiciary Committee. On September 23, 2021, his nomination was reported out of committee by a 13–9 vote. On October 27, 2021, the United States Senate invoked cloture on his nomination by a 52–46 vote. On October 28, 2021, his nomination was confirmed by a 52–46 vote. He received his judicial commission on November 12, 2021.

See also 
 List of African-American federal judges
 List of African-American jurists
 List of Hispanic/Latino American jurists

References

External links 

1977 births
Living people
21st-century American judges
21st-century American lawyers
African-American judges
African-American lawyers
Connecticut lawyers
Connecticut state court judges
Hispanic and Latino American judges
Judges of the United States District Court for the District of Connecticut
Lawyers from Rochester, New York
Public defenders
United States district court judges appointed by Joe Biden
University of Connecticut alumni
University of Connecticut School of Law alumni